Gudlavalleti Chalapati Rao or Gudlavalleti Venkata Chalapati Rao (వేంకట చలపతి రావు) was a noted writer, philosopher and an ex Deputy commissioner of Endowments Department in the Government of Andhra Pradesh. He was born in 1915 at Gudlavalleru, Krishna District, Andhra Pradesh to Venkata Ramaih Gudlavalleti and Suryakantham Gudlavalleti. He graduated from Andhra University (Bachelor of Arts) and also took a law degree from Madras University (Bachelor of Law). After his education, he served in the Revenue, Employment & Training and Endowments Departments, finally retired as Selection Grade Deputy Collector, finally settling down at Machilipatnam, Andhra Pradesh. He was married to Krishnaveni amma Gudlavalleti and has three sons and a daughter.

With the vast experience he gathered during his spell in the Endowments Departments, he authored several books on Temples of Srikakulam, Vishaka (including Vizianagaram), East and West Godavari Districts of Andhra Pradesh. These books are some of the rare specimens of the past information about the historic and other famous temples in the coastal Andhra Pradesh.

He also rendered Adhyatma Ramayanam from Sanskrit into Telugu and Sri Rama Charita Manas of Tulasidas from Hindi to Telugu. The Andhra Pradesh Sahitya Academy recognized his contribution and gave a cash grant for his "Adhyatma Ramayanam."

Works and Publications 
 Ramadas of Bhadrachalam, released on 18 October 1980
 Sri Rama Charita Manas of Tulasidas, translated from Hindi into Telugu
 Adhyatma Ramayanam, rendered from Sanskrit into Telugu
 Sri Venkatachala, its glory, Tirumalai-Tirupati Devasthanam, 1983
 Temples of Vizianagaram District
 Temples of East and West Godavari District
 Temples of Srikakulam District

References 

Telugu poets
Telugu writers
1987 deaths
1915 births
20th-century Indian poets
Poets from Andhra Pradesh
People from Krishna district
Indian Institute of Science alumni
Indian male poets
20th-century Indian male writers